The daggertooth pike conger (Muraenesox cinereus) also known as the darkfin pike eel in Australia, to distinguish it from the related pike-eel  (Muraenesox bagio), is a species of eel in the pike conger family, Muraenesocidae. Daggertooth pike congers occur in the Red Sea, on the coast of the northern Indian Ocean, and in the West Pacific from Indochina to Japan. A single specimen was also reported in the Mediterranean Sea off Israel in 1982.

Culinary uses 

Daggertooth pike conger is a major commercial species, with annual catches reaching about 350,000 tonnes in recent years. The spot reporting the largest landings was Taiwan Province of China. It is eaten in Japanese cuisine, where it is known as hamo (ハモ, 鱧). In the Kansai Region, hamo no kawa (pickled conger skins) is a traditional delicacy, and pike conger is a common ingredient in some types of kamaboko (fish cake).

Parasites 

As other fish, the daggertooth pike conger harbours several species of parasites. 
A species of trichosomoidid nematode which parasitizes the muscles of the fish off Japan has been described in 2014 and named Huffmanela hamo, in reference to the Japanese name of the fish. Accumulations of eggs of the parasite are visible as 1–2 mm black spots in the flesh of the fish. The parasite is rare and the consumption of infected fish meat has no consequences for humans.

Gallery

References

External links
Iron Chef Battle: Pike Eel
Darfin Pike Eel @ Fishes of Australia

daggertooth pike conger
Fish of the Indian Ocean
Marine fish of Northern Australia
Commercial fish
daggertooth pike conger